By My Side may refer to:

By My Side (album), a 2010 album by David Choi, or the title song
"By My Side" (INXS song), 1991
"By My Side" (Jadakiss song), 2009
"By My Side" (Lorrie Morgan and Jon Randall song), 1996
"By My Side", by 3 Doors Down, from their album The Better Life, 2000
"By My Side", by Ben Harper, from his album Fight for Your Mind, 1995
"By My Side", by David Choi, from his album By My Side, 2010, also covered by Maudy Ayunda
"By My Side", by Kasabian, from their album Empire, 2006
"By My Side", by Little River Band, from their album First Under the Wire, 1979
"By My Side", a song from the musical Godspell
By My Side (TV series), a Singaporean Chinese drama 
By My Side (film), a 2017 film directed by Reuben Kang